The Lamington Historic District is a historic district located in Lamington, an unincorporated community in Bedminster Township, Somerset County, New Jersey. The district was added to the National Register of Historic Places on June 21, 1984.

Gallery of contributing properties

References

National Register of Historic Places in Somerset County, New Jersey
Historic districts on the National Register of Historic Places in New Jersey
New Jersey Register of Historic Places
Greek Revival architecture in New Jersey
Queen Anne architecture in New Jersey
Bedminster, New Jersey